Oblivion with Bells is the seventh studio album from Underworld, released on  in Japan,  in the EU and  in the US. Due to the success of lead single "Crocodile" and the use of "To Heal" as a central theme in the film Sunshine, Oblivion with Bells has sold over 93,000 copies worldwide, as of 23 May 2008.

Critical reception
Oblivion with Bells received mostly positive reviews from most music critics. The album has a score of 64/100 on Metacritic based on 24 reviews. Allmusic gave the album 3 out of 5 stars saying "The acid techno is firmly in place, with little or no regard for developments in the form after the '80s. Still, unlike other electronica mainstays who have occasionally revealed a little weariness -- either from trying to change or trying to stay the same -- Underworld never sound particularly tired on Oblivion with Bells". NME gave the album 8/10 saying that "Oblivion With Bells is less the comedown than the sound of the party still going 10 years on". Drowned in Sound gave the album 6/10 saying that "After an auspicious introduction Oblivion With Bells has disappointingly descended into an irreconcilable docile abyss".

Track listing
All songs by Karl Hyde and Rick Smith.

Additional track on the Japanese release (Traffic, TRCP10):
 "Loads of Birds" – 5:30

Book of Jam – Video DVD [UWR-00017-5 (UK) and SOR0001 (US) only]
 Crocodile (video) – 3:57
 Tokyo Makuhari (slideshow with "Boy, Boy, Boy") – 1:32
 Metal Friend (video) – 1:37
 Abbey Road Recording Session (slideshow with "Globe") – 1:31
 Good Morning Cockerel (video) – 2:31
 Rez Live (video) – 9:28
 Art Jam (slideshow with "Faxed Invitation") – 1:46

Release history

Appearances
To Heal appears as part of the score for the movie Sunshine. Glam Bucket and To Heal both appear in the video game Need For Speed Undercover.

Translation
 The word  "mamgu " (pronounced "mam-ghee" ) from the track "Best Mamgu Ever" is the Welsh word for grandmother

Charts

References

2007 albums
Underworld (band) albums
TBD Records albums